Rocky River was an electoral district of the House of Assembly in the Australian state of South Australia from March 1938 to December 1985.

The electorate was based in the Mid North region, around the towns of Crystal Brook, Gladstone and Port Germein. In 1938, the polling places were Beetaloo Valley, Crystal Brook, Napperby, Hundred of Pirie, Wandearah, Warnertown, Appila, Bundaleer Spring, Caltowie, Georgetown, Gladstone, Gulnare, Laura, Narridy, Stone Hut, Tarcowie, Wirrabara, Yandiah, Baroota, Port Germein, Telowie.

John Olsen moved from the abolished Rocky River to Custance at the 1985 election.

Members

Election results

References

Former Members of the Parliament of South Australia

Former electoral districts of South Australia
1938 establishments in Australia
1985 disestablishments in Australia